Crobylophora daricella is a moth in the  family Lyonetiidae.

Distribution
It has been recorded from  India, Malaysia, Sri Lanka, South Africa and Australia.

The larvae feed on Plumbago auriculata.

References
Meyrick, E. 1880b. Descriptions of Australian Micro-Lepidoptera. III. Tineina. - Proceedings of the Linnean Society of New South Wales 5:132–182.

Lyonetiidae
Moths described in 1881